Josephine Tsang Sau-ho (1960 – 1 May 2022) was an elected member of the Hong Kong District Council (Islands District), representing the Peng Chau and Hei Ling Chau constituency. Tsang first ran for the District Council after the then incumbent, Mr On Hing-Ying, died on 18 April 2014, while in office. During the subsequent by-election, Ms Tsang secured 55.7% of the vote and was duly elected on 7 September 2014. Regular District Council elections were held the following year during which Ms Tsang ran uncontested.

Ms Tsang was also a member of the Community Liaison Group for the Hong Kong Airport Authority regarding the introduction of the Third Runway, as a representative of the Islands District.

Tsang was found dead in her office on 1 May 2022, in a suspected charcoal-burning suicide.

See also
 District Councils of Hong Kong
 Islands District Council
 Peng Chau

References

1960 births
2022 deaths
2022 suicides
21st-century women politicians
District councillors of Islands District
Hong Kong women in politics